Astrid Timmermann-Fechter (born 22 June 1963) is a German politician for the CDU and since 2021 a member of the Bundestag, the federal diet.

Life and politics 
Timmermann-Fechter was born in 1963 in the West German town of Marl, North Rhine-Westphalia and was a member of the Bundestag from 2013 to 2017 and again since 2021.

References 

Living people
People from Marl, North Rhine-Westphalia
1963 births
Christian Democratic Union of Germany politicians
21st-century German politicians
Members of the Bundestag 2021–2025